Baad is a Japanese rock band that formed in 1992 and debuted in February 1993 with the single "Donna Toki Demo Hold Me Tight" and quickly rose to the top. Their biggest hit came months later with the single "Kimi ga Suki da to Sakebitai" that was used in the anime series Slam Dunk. The main vocalist and lyricist Yamada Kyouji left the band in 1995 and replaced by Hata Hideki as a second vocalist. Following that, the band switched labels from ZAIN Records to Nippon Columbia. The band disbanded in 1999 due to unknown reasons.

Members
 Shinichiro Ohta (大田紳一郎; Guitar, Chorus, Lyricist, Composer)
 Kobayashi Masamichi (小林正道; Bass)
 Hata Hideki (秦 秀樹; Second Vocalist, Lyricist)
 Arai Yasunori (新井康徳; Drums)

Past Member
 Yamada Kyouji (山田恭二; First Vocalist, Lyricist)

Single
 [1993.02.17] Donna Toki Demo Hold Me Tight (どんな時でもHold Me Tight)
 [1993.05.26] Aishitai Aisenai (愛したい愛せない)
 [1993.12.01] Kimi ga Suki da to Sakebitai (君が好きだと叫びたい)
 [1994.07.27] Dakishimetai Mou Ichido (抱きしめたいもう一度)
 [1994.11.09] Kimi wa Manual Toori ni wa Ugokanai (君はマニュアル通りには動かない)
 [1996.08.07] Modorenai Jikan no Naka (戻れない時間の中)
 [1997.07.23] Mune ni Idaite Wasurenai (胸に抱いて忘れない)
 [1998.02.21] Kiss Me
 [1998.05.23] Follow Me
 [1998.08.05] Koishite Hajimete Shitta Kimi (恋してはじめて知った君)

Albums
 [1994.02.23] BAAD
 [1994.11.21] Get Back Together
 [1998.09.23] B-SOUL

Anime Soundtrack
 [1993.12.01] Kimi ga Suki da to Sakebitai (君が好きだと叫びたい) Opening song for the anime Slam Dunk

External links
 Official site

Japanese pop rock music groups
Japanese rock music groups
Being Inc. artists
Musical groups established in 1992
Musical groups disestablished in 1999